Kevin Daniel Flynn (born ) is a former politician in Ontario, Canada. He was a Liberal member of the Legislative Assembly of Ontario from 2003 to 2018 who represented the riding of Oakville. He served in the cabinet of the government of Kathleen Wynne.

Background
Flynn was born in Liverpool, England. He immigrated to Canada with his family at the age of 12. Prior to entering politics he was a small business owner and served as Chair of the Financial Department for the Royal Botanical Gardens. He and his wife Janice live in Oakville, Ontario.

Politics
Flynn ran for the Ontario legislature in the provincial election of 1985, as a New Democrat. He finished a distant third in Oakville, where the NDP has a limited base of support. Later in the year, he was elected as an Oakville Town Councillor and a Halton Regional Councillor.

He ran for election to the Legislative Assembly in the riding of Oakville, this time as a Liberal, in the provincial election of 1999. He was defeated by incumbent Progressive Conservative Gary Carr.

Carr retired in 2003, and later joined the federal Liberal Party.  In 2003, Flynn ran for the seat again and this time defeated Progressive Conservative candidate Kurt Franklin by about 3500 votes. The Premier appointed Flynn as parliamentary assistant to the Minister of Labour in 2004. Subsequently, Flynn served as Parliamentary Assistant to the Minister of Energy, the Minister of the Environment, the Minister of Training, Colleges and Universities, and the Minister of Education.

In the 2007 election, Flynn ran for re-election and increased his margin of victory to 7096 votes over the Progressive Conservative challenger, Rick Byers.

Flynn has worked to ensure the protection of environmentally-sensitive land in his riding and his town, which is larger than his riding.  In November 2004, he was applauded by the local media for his work in reserving 1286 acres (5 km²) of land in North Oakville as public greenspace.

On November 18, 2010, Flynn was nominated as the Liberal party candidate in Oakville for the 2011 provincial election. In the 2011 election, which saw the Liberals reduced to a minority government, Flynn increased his percentage of victory, although his margin of victory was reduced to 4580 votes over the Progressive Conservative challenger, Larry Scott.

Following the election, Flynn unsuccessfully ran to become Speaker of the Legislative Assembly of Ontario, losing to fellow Liberal Dave Levac, MPP for Brant. In June 2013, he was named Chief Government Whip.

He was re-elected in the 2014 election.

On June 24, 2014, Premier Kathleen Wynne appointed him as Minister of Labour.

On June 7, 2018, he was defeated by Progressive Conservative candidate Stephen Crawford in the 42nd Ontario general election.

Ahead of the 2019 federal election, Flynn sought the federal Liberal nomination in Oakville. On June 12, 2019 Flynn lost the nomination to Anita Anand, who went on to win the general election.

Cabinet positions

Electoral record

References

External links

1955 births
21st-century Canadian politicians
Living people
Ontario Liberal Party MPPs
Members of the Executive Council of Ontario
People from Oakville, Ontario